Abubakar Magomedovich Nurmagomedov (born November 13, 1989) is a Russian mixed martial artist, who is currently competing in the Welterweight division of the Ultimate Fighting Championship. He is a three-time Combat Sambo World Championship bronze medalist and Russian national combat sambo champion.

Background
Abubakar Nurmagomedov was born on November 13, 1989 in the village of Goksuv in Khasavyurtovsky District, Dagestan. At primary school Abubakar began to train in freestyle wrestling, and after high school he switched to Combat Sambo under Abdulmanap Nurmagomedov. In 2014 he won the bronze medal match at the Combat Sambo World Championships.

Mixed martial arts career

Early career
Nurmagomedov made his professional MMA debut in October 2011 against Ibrahim Dzhantukhanov of Russia, and won in the first round by Submission (armbar). At the 	Sochi Star tournament he lost to Magomed Mustafaev by technical knockout in the first round.

World Combat Sambo Championship 
Abubakar came in third place in various world combat sambo tournaments,  against multiple world champions like Yaroslav Amosov and Pavel Kusch, and Eldar Eldarov in the tournaments he competed in.

World Series of Fighting
In March Nurmagomedov signed a contract with WSOF.

In his WSOF debut, Nurmagomedov defeated Jorge Moreno of USA on August 1, 2015 at WSOF 22 via unanimous decision.

After his debut he beat next opponent from Las Vegas, Nevada Danny Davis Jr. on December 18, 2015 at WSOF 26 via unanimous decision.

Nurmagomedov faced Matthew Frincu on April 2, 2016 at WSOF 30. He won the fight via TKO in the second round.

Nurmagomedov faced John Howard on October 7, 2016 at WSOF 33. He won the fight via unanimous decision.

Nurmagomedov faced Matt Secor on 18 March 2017 at WSOF 35. He won the fight via unanimous decision.

Professional Fighters League

Nurmagomedov competed at PFL welterweight Grand-Prix. He faced Pavel Kusch in the opening round at PFL 3 on July 5, 2018. He lost the fight via rear-naked choke submission in the second round.

Nurmagomedov faced Jonatan Westin on August 16, 2018 at PFL 6. He won the fight by unanimous decision.

On October 15, 2018, it was announced that Nurmagomedov would replace João Zeferino in the Welterweight Tournament at PFL 10 on October 20, 2018. He faced Bojan Veličković in the quarter-final round. The bout ended in a unanimous draw with Nurmagomedov advancing due to winning the first round. However, Nurmagomedov did not advance to semifinals due to hand injury and Veličković replaced him.

Ultimate Fighting Championship 
Nurmagomedov made his promotional debut on November 9, 2019 at UFC Fight Night 163 against David Zawada. He lost the fight via submission in round one.

Nurmagomedov faced Jared Gooden on March 27, 2021 at UFC 260. He won the fight via unanimous decision.

Nurmagomedov was scheduled to face Daniel Rodriguez on July 17, 2021 at UFC on ESPN 26. However, Nurmagomedov was forced to withdraw from the event, citing injury.

Nurmagomedov was scheduled to face Philip Rowe on July 16, 2022 at UFC on ABC: Ortega vs. Rodríguez. However, the pairing was cancelled due to complications on both sides. Rowe has been forced to withdraw due to an injury, while Nurmagomedov is dealing with visa issues.

Nurmagomedov faced Gadzhi Omargadzhiev on October 22, 2022 at UFC 280. He won the bout via unanimous decision.

Nurmagomedov was scheduled to face Carlston Harris on March 11, 2023, at UFC Fight Night 221. However, Nurmagomedov withdrew from the bout due to an undisclosed reasons and was replaced by Jared Gooden.

Championships and accomplishments

Sambo
World Combat Sambo Federation (WCSF)
World Championship-Moscow, Russia (2013) at 82kg 
World Cup in Combat Sambo Among Professionals-Gaspra, Crimea in 2014 at 82kg
World Championship-Moscow, Russia (2014) at 82kg

Controversies

UFC 229 Nurmagomedov-McGregor post-fight incident 
At UFC 229, Khabib Nurmagomedov jumped the cage after his title victory and charged toward Conor McGregor's cornerman Dillon Danis. Soon after, McGregor and Abubakar attempted to exit the octagon, but a scuffle broke out between them after Abubakar was attacked by McGregor. McGregor was then attacked by two of Khabib's corner men,  Zubaira Tukhugov and Esed Emiragaev. On January 29, 2019, the NSAC announced a one-year suspension for Nurmagomedov, (retroactive to October 6, 2018) and a $25,000 fine. He became eligible to compete again on June 6, 2019.

Mixed martial arts record

|-
|Win
|align=center|17–3–1
|Gadzhi Omargadzhiev
|Decision (unanimous)
|UFC 280
|
|align=center|3
|align=center|5:00
|Abu Dhabi, United Arab Emirates
|
|-
|Win
|align=center|16–3–1
|Jared Gooden
|Decision (unanimous)
|UFC 260
|
|align=center|3
|align=center|5:00
|Las Vegas, Nevada, United States
|
|-
|Loss
|align=center|15–3–1
|David Zawada
|Submission (triangle choke)
|UFC Fight Night: Magomedsharipov vs. Kattar 
|
|align=center|1
|align=center|2:50
|Moscow, Russia
|
|-
|Draw
|align=center|
|Bojan Veličković
|Draw (unanimous)
|PFL 10
|
|align=center| 2
|align=center| 5:00
|Washington, D.C., United States
|
|-
|Win
|align=center|15–2
|Jonatan Westin
|Decision (unanimous)
|PFL 6 
|
|align=center|3
|align=center|5:00
|Atlantic City, New Jersey, United States
|
|-
|Loss
|align=center|14–2
|Pavel Kusch
|Submission (rear-naked choke)
|PFL 3 
|
|align=center|2
|align=center|1:23
|Washington, D.C., United States
|
|-
|Win
|align=center|14–1
|Matt Secor
|Decision (unanimous)
|WSOF 35
|
|align=center|3
|align=center|5:00
|Verona, New York, United States
|
|-
|Win
|align=center|13–1
|John Howard
|Decision (unanimous)
|WSOF 33
|
|align=center|3
|align=center|5:00
|Kansas City, Missouri, United States
|
|-
| Win
| align=center|12–1
| Matthew Frincu
| TKO (punches)
| WSOF 30
| 
| align=center| 2 
| align=center| 3:05
| Las Vegas, Nevada, United States 
|
|-
| Win
| align=center| 11–1
| Danny Davis Jr.
| Decision (unanimous)
| WSOF 26
| 
| align=center| 3
| align=center| 5:00
| Las Vegas, Nevada, United States 
| 
|-
| Win
| align=center| 10–1
| Jorge Moreno
| Decision (unanimous)
| WSOF 22
| 
| align=center| 3
| align=center| 5:00
| Las Vegas, Nevada, United States 
| 
|-
| Win
| align=center| 9–1
| Vladimir Gunzu
| TKO (punches)
| Sochi Star Club: Sochi Star Tournament 3
| 
| align=center| 1
| align=center| N/A
| Sochi, Russia
|
|-
| Loss
| align=center| 8–1
| Magomed Mustafaev
| TKO (doctor stoppage)
| rowspan=2|Sochi Star Club: Sochi Star Tournament 1
| rowspan=2|
| align=center| 2
| align=center| 4:11
| rowspan=2|Sochi, Russia
| 
|-
| Win
| align=center| 8–0
| Richard Totrav
| TKO (punches)
| align=center| 1
| align=center| 4:27
| 
|-
| Win
| align=center| 7–0
| Dmitry Capmari
| TKO (punches)
| Union of Veterans of Sport: Champion Cup
| 
| align=center| 1
| align=center| 3:36
| Novosibirsk, Russia
|
|-
| Win
| align=center| 6–0
| Magomed Shakhbanov
| TKO (punches)
| Liga Kavkaz: Grand Umakhan Battle
| 
| align=center| 1
| align=center| 2:46
| Khunzakh, Russia
|
|-
| Win
| align=center| 5–0
| Yuri Grigoryan
| Submission (kimura)
| Russian MMA Union: St. Petersburg MMA Championship 1
| 
| align=center| 1
| align=center| 1:40
| Saint Petersburg, Russia 
| 
|-
| Win
| align=center| 4–0
| Sergei Akinin
| TKO (punches)
| rowspan=2|OctagonMMA Warriors: Nurmagomedov vs. Akinin
| rowspan=2|
| align=center| 1
| align=center| 4:10
| rowspan=2|Zhukovsky, Russia
|
|-
| Win
| align=center| 3–0
| Adilbek Zhaldoshov
| TKO (punches)
| align=center| 1
| align=center| 3:40
|
|-
| Win
| align=center| 2–0
| Anatoly Safronov
| Submission (triangle choke)
| Liga Kavkaz 2012
| 
| align=center| 1
| align=center| 2:30
| Khasavyurt, Russia
| 
|-
| Win
| align=center| 1–0
| Ibrahim Dzhantukhanov
| Submission (armbar)
| ProFC: Battle in the Caucasus
| 
| align=center| 1
| align=center| 1:32
| Khasavyurt, Russia
|
|-

See also
 List of current WSOF fighters
 List of male mixed martial artists

References

External links 

 

1989 births
Avar people
Nurmagomedov family
Dagestani mixed martial artists
Living people
Sportspeople from Makhachkala
Russian expatriates in the United States
Russian male mixed martial artists
Russian sambo practitioners
Lightweight mixed martial artists
Welterweight mixed martial artists
Ultimate Fighting Championship male fighters
Mixed martial artists utilizing sambo